Big Brother Jake is an American sitcom starring Jake Steinfeld that aired on The Family Channel from September 2, 1990 to April 10, 1994.  It is notable for being the first sitcom on The Family Channel.

Plot
The show follows the life of Jake Rozzner (Steinfeld), a former Hollywood stuntman who returned to his Brooklyn foster home to help out his recently widowed foster mother, Connie "Ma" Duncan with her foster children. The foster family included Lou, Kateri, Jill, Andy, and Dave. Jill left the show after two seasons and a young, abandoned Asian girl, Caroline was in the care of Ma Duncan.

Gary was Jake's good friend from high school who was now a Manhattan lawyer and Jane was Jake's former high school girlfriend. Miss Morgan was the social worker before being replaced with Miss Domedian. The older youngsters attended Frederick Douglass High School. Jake was the narrator of the show.

Cast
Jake Steinfeld as Jake Rozzner
Barbara Meek as Connie "Ma" Duncan
Ben Siegler as Gary MacClemore
Josiah Trager as Loomis "Lou" Washington
Gabrielle Carmouche as Kateri Monroe
Jeremy Wieand as Andy King
Daniel Hilfer as Dave King
Elizabeth Narvaez as Jill Kenyon (1990–1992)
Melody Combs as Jane O'Hara (1991–1993)
Rachelle Guzy as Caroline (1992-1994)
Denise Devin as Miss Meg Morgan (1990-1991)
Jane Connell as Miss Roberta Domedian (1991-1994)

Episodes

Season 1 (1990–91)

Season 2 (1991–92)

Season 3 (1992–93)

Season 4 (1993–94)

References

External links

1990 American television series debuts
1994 American television series endings
1990s American sitcoms
English-language television shows
The Family Channel (American TV network, founded 1990) original programming
Television shows set in New York City